Gramercy Tavern is a New American restaurant located at 42 East 20th Street (between Broadway and Park Avenue S.), in the Flatiron District in Manhattan, New York City.

It is owned by Danny Meyer (originally co-founded by Meyer and Chef Tom Colicchio), along with Chef/Partner Michael Anthony.  The Executive Pastry Chef is Miro Uskoković.  The General Manager is William Carroll. The restaurant opened in July 1994.

Menu
Chef Michael Anthony's ever-evolving seasonal menu of New American cuisine showcases the restaurant's relationships with local farms and purveyors.

Restaurant
The restaurant was designed by New York-based architecture firm Bentel & Bentel Architects. This was the firm's first foray into hospitality design. The restaurant's neo-Colonial decor is soothing and elegantly rustic. The restaurant can seat 130 people, the bar can accommodate 60 people, and a private dining room can seat 12–22 people.

Reviews and accolades 
In 2003, 2005, 2006, 2007, 2010, 2011, and 2015, voters in the Zagats Survey voted it the most popular restaurant in New York City.  In 2007, the New York Times gave it three stars.

In 2013, Zagats gave it a food rating of 28, referring to it as “About as perfect as a restaurant can get”.  It also rated it Number 1 in New York City for "Dining at the Bar," and the second most popular restaurant in New York City.

Gramercy Tavern was awarded One Star by the Michelin Guide.

The restaurant was named "Outstanding Restaurant of 2008" from the James Beard Foundation.

Wine Spectator awarded Best Of Award of Excellence in 2009, 2010, 2011, 2012, and 2013.

See also
 List of New American restaurants

References

Further reading
 Claudia Fleming & Melissa Clark, The Last Course: The Desserts of Gramercy Tavern, Random House (2001)
 Danny Meyer, Mix Shake Stir: Recipes from Danny Meyer's Acclaimed New York City Restaurants, Hachette Digital (2009)

External links
Official website

Restaurants in Manhattan
Restaurants established in 1994
Flatiron District
New American restaurants in New York (state)
James Beard Foundation Award winners
1994 establishments in New York City
Michelin Guide starred restaurants in New York (state)